Boguszewicz is a Polish surname. In Lithuanian Boguševičius, Boguševičienė, Boguševičiūtė. Notable people with the surname include:

 Czesław Boguszewicz (born 1950), Polish footballer and manager
 Lech Boguszewicz (1938–2010), Polish athlete

Polish-language surnames